Ravindra Kumar may refer to:

Ravindra Kumar (editor) (born 1960), editor and managing director of Indian newspaper The Statesman
Ravindra Kumar (political scientist) (born 1959), Indian academic
G. Ravindra Kumar (born 1961), Indian laser physicist